Tottington High School is a coeducational secondary school located in Tottington, Bury, England.

The school opened in 1955. Previously a community school administered by Bury Metropolitan Borough Council, in November 2018 Tottington High School converted to academy status. The school is now sponsored by the Shaw Education Trust.

References

Secondary schools in the Metropolitan Borough of Bury
Academies in the Metropolitan Borough of Bury
Educational institutions established in 1955
1955 establishments in England
Shaw Education Trust